Kronprinsessegade 42 is a Neoclassical property overlooking Rosenborg Castle Garden in central Copenhagen, Denmark.

History
Kronprinsessegade 42 was built by master builder Thomas A. Blom (1777-1841) in 1815-1816. He lived next door in No. 40, a building he had completed in 1811.

The merchant Hans Puggaard lived in the building from 1816 to1818.  Jacob H. Mansa (1797-1885), a military officer and Cartographer, was a resident in 1832-33. Another military officer,  H. C. G. F. Hedemann (1792-1859), lived there from 1838 to 1846.

Editor and politician Hother Hage (1816-1873)  lived in the building from 1847 to 1851. Bishop and politician D. G. Monrad (1811-1887) was a resident at No. 42 in 1856.

Architecture
Kronprinsessegade 42 is six bays wide. The roof is a Mansard roof with seven dormers.

References

External links

Listed residential buildings in Copenhagen
Thomas Blom buildings
Residential buildings completed in 1816
1816 establishments in Denmark